In mathematics, the integral of a non-negative function of a single variable can be regarded, in the simplest case, as the area between the graph of that function and the -axis. The Lebesgue integral, named after French mathematician Henri Lebesgue, extends the integral to a larger class of functions. It also extends the domains on which these functions can be defined.

Long before the 20th century, mathematicians already understood that for non-negative functions with a smooth enough graph—such as continuous functions on closed bounded intervals—the area under the curve could be defined as the integral, and computed using approximation techniques on the region by polygons.  However, as the need to consider more irregular functions arose—e.g., as a result of the limiting processes of mathematical analysis and the mathematical theory of probability—it became clear that more careful approximation techniques were needed to define a suitable integral.  Also, one might wish to integrate on spaces more general than the real line. The Lebesgue integral provides the necessary abstractions for this.

The Lebesgue integral plays an important role in probability theory, real analysis, and many other fields in mathematics. It is named after Henri Lebesgue (1875–1941), who introduced the integral . It is also a pivotal part of the axiomatic theory of probability.

The term Lebesgue integration can mean either the general theory of integration of a function with respect to a general measure, as introduced by Lebesgue, or the specific case of integration of a function defined on a sub-domain of the real line with respect to the Lebesgue measure.

Introduction 
This is straightforward for functions such as polynomials, but what does it mean for more exotic functions? In general, for which class of functions does "area under the curve" make sense? The answer to this question has great theoretical and practical importance.

As part of a general movement toward rigor in mathematics in the nineteenth century, mathematicians attempted to put integral calculus on a firm foundation. The Riemann integral—proposed by Bernhard Riemann (1826–1866)—is a broadly successful attempt to provide such a foundation. Riemann's definition starts with the construction of a sequence of easily calculated areas that converge to the integral of a given function. This definition is successful in the sense that it gives the expected answer for many already-solved problems, and gives useful results for many other problems.

However, Riemann integration does not interact well with taking limits of sequences of functions, making such limiting processes difficult to analyze. This is important, for instance, in the study of Fourier series, Fourier transforms, and other topics. The Lebesgue integral is better able to describe how and when it is possible to take limits under the integral sign (via the monotone convergence theorem and dominated convergence theorem).

While the Riemann integral considers the area under a curve as made out of vertical rectangles, the Lebesgue definition considers horizontal slabs that are not necessarily just rectangles, and so it is more flexible. For this reason, the Lebesgue definition makes it possible to calculate integrals for a broader class of functions. For example, the Dirichlet function, which is 0 where its argument is irrational and 1 otherwise, has a Lebesgue integral, but does not have a Riemann integral.  Furthermore, the Lebesgue integral of this function is zero, which agrees with the intuition that when picking a real number uniformly at random from the unit interval, the probability of picking a rational number should be zero.

Lebesgue summarized his approach to integration in a letter to Paul Montel:

The insight is that one should be able to rearrange the values of a function freely, while preserving the value of the integral.  This process of rearrangement can convert a very pathological function into one that is "nice" from the point of view of integration, and thus let such pathological functions be integrated.

Intuitive interpretation 

For the Riemann integral, the domain is partitioned into intervals, and bars are constructed to meet the height of the graph.

For the Lebesgue integral, the range is partitioned into intervals, and so the region under the graph is partitioned into horizontal "slabs" (which may not be connected sets).  The area of a small horizontal "slab" under the graph of f, of height dy, is equal to the measure of the slab's width times dy:

The Lebesgue integral may then be defined by adding up the areas of these horizontal slabs.

Simple functions

An equivalent way to introduce the Lebesgue integral is to use so-called simple functions, which generalize the step functions of Riemann integration. Consider, for example, determining the cumulative COVID-19 case count from a graph of smoothed new daily cases (right).

The Riemann–Darboux approach Partition the domain (time period) into intervals (eight, in the example at right) and construct bars with heights that meet the graph. The cumulative count is found by summing, over all bars, the product of interval width (time in days) and the bar height (cases per day).

The Lebesgue approach Choose a finite number of target values (eight, in the example) in the range of the function. By constructing bars with heights equal to these values, but below the function, they imply a partitioning of the domain into the same number of subsets (subsets, indicated by color in the example, need not be connected). This is a "simple function," as described below. The cumulative count is found by summing, over all subsets of the domain, the product of the measure on that subset (total time in days) and the bar height (cases per day).

Measure theory 

Measure theory was initially created to provide a useful abstraction of the notion of length of subsets of the real line—and, more generally, area and volume of subsets of Euclidean spaces. In particular, it provided a systematic answer to the question of which subsets of  have a length. This suggests that picking out a suitable class of measurable subsets is an essential prerequisite.

The Riemann integral uses the notion of length explicitly. Indeed, the element of calculation for the Riemann integral is the rectangle , whose area is calculated to be . Riemann could only use planar rectangles to approximate the area under the curve, because there was no adequate theory for measuring more general sets.

In the development of the theory in most modern textbooks (after 1950), the approach to measure and integration is axiomatic.  This means that a measure is any function μ defined on a certain class  of subsets of a set , which satisfies a certain list of properties. These properties can be shown to hold in many different cases.

Measurable functions 

In the mathematical theory of probability, we confine our study to a probability measure , which satisfies .

Lebesgue's theory defines integrals for a class of functions called measurable functions.

The set of measurable functions is closed under algebraic operations, but more importantly it is closed under various kinds of point-wise sequential limits:

 

are measurable if the original sequence , where , consists of measurable functions.

 

Definition
The theory of the Lebesgue integral requires a theory of measurable sets and measures on these sets, as well as a theory of measurable functions and integrals on these functions.

Via simple functions

One approach to constructing the Lebesgue integral is to make use of so-called simple functions: finite, real linear combinations of indicator functions. Simple functions that lie directly underneath a given function  can be constructed by partitioning the range of  into a finite number of layers. In this way, the partitioning of the range of  implies a partitioning of its domain. The integral of a simple function is found by summing, over these (not necessarily connected) subsets of the domain, the product of the measure of the subset and its image under the simple function (the lower bound of the corresponding layer); intuitively, this product is the sum of the areas of all bars of the same height. The integral of a non-negative general measurable function is then defined as an appropriate supremum of approximations by simple functions, and the integral of a (not necessarily positive) measurable function is the difference of two integrals of non-negative measurable functions.

Indicator functions  
To assign a value to the integral of the indicator function  of a measurable set  consistent with the given measure μ, the only reasonable choice is to set:

Simple functions 
A finite linear combination of indicator functions

We extend the integral by linearity to non-negative measurable simple functions. When the coefficients  are positive, we set

whether this sum is finite or +∞. A simple function can be written in different ways as a linear combination of indicator functions, but the integral will be the same by the additivity of measures.

Some care is needed when defining the integral of a real-valued simple function, to avoid the undefined expression : one assumes that the representation

is such that  whenever . Then the above formula for the integral of f makes sense, and the result does not depend upon the particular representation of  satisfying the assumptions.

Non-negative functions 
We define

We need to show this integral coincides with the preceding one, defined on the set of simple functions, when E  is a segment [a, b]. There is also the question of whether this corresponds in any way to a Riemann notion of integration. It is possible to prove that the answer to both questions is yes.

We have defined the integral of f for any non-negative extended real-valued measurable function on E. For some functions, this integral  is infinite.

It is often useful to have a particular sequence of simple functions that approximates the Lebesgue integral well (analogously to a Riemann sum).  For a non-negative measurable function , let  be the simple function whose value is  whenever , for k a non-negative integer less than (say) .  Then it can be proven directly that

and that the limit on the right hand side exists as an extended real number.  This bridges the connection between the approach to the Lebesgue integral using simple functions, and the motivation for the Lebesgue integral using a partition of the range.

Signed functions 
To handle signed functions, we need a few more definitions. If  is a measurable function of the set  to the reals (including ), then we can write

where

Also note that

In this case we define

If

we say that  is Lebesgue integrable.

It turns out that this definition gives the desirable properties of the integral.

Via improper Riemann integral
Assuming that  is measurable and non-negative, the function

is monotonically non-increasing. The Lebesgue integral may then be defined as the improper Riemann integral of :

It exists, with the allowance that it may be infinite.

As above, the integral of a Lebesgue integrable (not necessarily non-negative) function is defined by subtracting the integral of its positive and negative parts.

Complex-valued functions 
Complex-valued functions can be similarly integrated, by considering the real part and the imaginary part separately.

If h=f+ig for real-valued integrable functions f, g, then the integral of h is defined by

The function is Lebesgue integrable if and only if its absolute value is Lebesgue integrable (see Absolutely integrable function).

Example 
Consider the indicator function of the rational numbers, also known as the Dirichlet function.  This function is nowhere continuous.

  is not Riemann-integrable on  :  No matter how the set  is partitioned into subintervals, each partition contains at least one rational and at least one irrational number, because rationals and irrationals are both dense in the reals.  Thus the upper Darboux sums are all one, and the lower Darboux sums are all zero.
  is Lebesgue-integrable on   using the Lebesgue measure:  Indeed, it is the indicator function of the rationals so by definition  because  is countable.

Domain of integration 
A technical issue in Lebesgue integration is that the domain of integration is defined as a set (a subset of a measure space), with no notion of orientation. In elementary calculus, one defines integration with respect to an orientation:

Generalizing this to higher dimensions yields integration of differential forms. By contrast, Lebesgue integration provides an alternative generalization, integrating over subsets with respect to a measure; this can be notated as

to indicate integration over a subset . For details on the relation between these generalizations, see .

Limitations of the Riemann integral 
With the advent of Fourier series, many analytical problems involving integrals came up whose satisfactory solution required interchanging limit processes and integral signs. However, the conditions under which the integrals

 

are equal proved quite elusive in the Riemann framework. There are some other technical difficulties with the Riemann integral. These are linked with the limit-taking difficulty discussed above.

Failure of monotone convergence. As shown above, the indicator function  on the rationals is not Riemann integrable. In particular, the Monotone convergence theorem fails. Then let

The function  is zero everywhere, except on a finite set of points. Hence its Riemann integral is zero.

Unsuitability for unbounded intervals. The Riemann integral can only integrate functions on a bounded interval.

Integrating on structures other than Euclidean space. The Riemann integral is inextricably linked to the order structure of the real line.

Basic theorems of the Lebesgue integral 
Two functions are said to be equal almost everywhere ( for short) if  is a subset of a null set.

Measurability of the set   is not required.

 If  are non-negative measurable functions (possibly assuming the value ) such that  almost everywhere, then  To wit, the integral respects the equivalence relation of almost-everywhere equality.
 Monotonicity: If , then 
 Let  be a measure space. Consider a -measurable non-negative function .
 Fatou's lemma: If  is a sequence of non-negative measurable functions, then  Again, the value of any of the integrals may be infinite.
 Dominated convergence theorem: Suppose  is a sequence of complex measurable functions with pointwise limit , and there is a Lebesgue integrable function  (i.e.,  belongs to the  such that  for all .  Then,  is Lebesgue integrable and

Alternative formulations 

It is possible to develop the integral with respect to the Lebesgue measure without relying on the full machinery of measure theory. One such approach is provided by the Daniell integral.

There is also an alternative approach to developing the theory of integration via methods of functional analysis. Integrals of more general functions can be built starting from these integrals.

Then  is a normed vector space (and in particular, it is a metric space.) All metric spaces have Hausdorff completions, so let  be its completion. This space is isomorphic to the space of Lebesgue integrable functions modulo the subspace of functions with integral zero. This integral is precisely the Lebesgue integral.

More generally, when the measure space on which the functions are defined is also a locally compact topological space (as is the case with the real numbers R), measures compatible with the topology in a suitable sense (Radon measures, of which the Lebesgue measure is an example) an integral with respect to them can be defined in the same manner, starting from the integrals of continuous functions with compact support. More precisely, the compactly supported functions form a vector space that carries a natural topology, and a (Radon) measure is defined as a continuous linear functional on this space. The value of a measure at a compactly supported function is then also by definition the integral of the function. One then proceeds to expand the measure (the integral) to more general functions by continuity, and defines the measure of a set as the integral of its indicator function. For details see Radon measures.

Limitations of Lebesgue integral 
The main purpose of the Lebesgue integral is to provide an integral notion where limits of integrals hold under mild assumptions. There is no guarantee that every function is Lebesgue integrable. But it may happen that improper integrals exist for functions that are not Lebesgue integrable. One example would be the sinc function:

over the entire real line. This function is not Lebesgue integrable, as

See also 
 Henri Lebesgue, for a non-technical description of Lebesgue integration
 Null set
 Integration
 Measure
 Sigma-algebra
 Lebesgue space
 Lebesgue–Stieltjes integration
 Riemann integral
 Henstock–Kurzweil integral

Notes

References 
 
 
 
  Very thorough treatment, particularly for probabilists with good notes and historical references.
 
  A classic, though somewhat dated presentation.
 
 
 
 
  Includes a presentation of the Daniell integral.
.
  Good treatment of the theory of outer measures.
 
   Known as Little Rudin, contains the basics of the Lebesgue theory, but does not treat material such as Fubini's theorem.
  Known as Big Rudin. A complete and careful presentation of the theory.  Good presentation of the Riesz extension theorems. However, there is a minor flaw (in the first edition) in the proof of one of the extension theorems, the discovery of which constitutes exercise 21 of Chapter 2.
 . English translation by Laurence Chisholm Young, with two additional notes by Stefan Banach.
  Emphasizes the Daniell integral.
 .
 
 

Definitions of mathematical integration
Measure theory
Lp spaces
Integrals